Sudeep Sanjeev (born 2 September 1973), also known as Sudeepa or Kichcha Sudeep, is an Indian actor, director, producer, screenwriter, television presenter and singer, who primarily works in Kannada films. He has also worked in Hindi, Telugu and Tamil films. He is one of the highest paid actors of Kannada Cinema and is one of the first Kannada actors to be listed in the Forbes list of top 100 celebrities of India since 2013.
He has received several awards including four Filmfare Awards South.

Sudeepa is known for his critically acclaimed performances in the Kannada films Sparsha (2000), Huchcha (2001), Nandhi (2002), Kiccha (2003), Swathi Muthu (2003), My Autograph (2006), No 73, Shanthi Nivasa (2007), Mussanjemaatu (2008), Veera Madakari (2009), Just Maath Maathalli (2010), Vishnuvardhana (2011), Kempe Gowda (2011), the Telugu-Tamil bilingual Eega (2012), Maanikya (2014), Ranna (2015), Kotigobba 2 (2016), Hebbuli (2017), The Villain (2018), Pailwaan (2019), Telugu-Hindi bilingual Rakta Charitra and the Hindi film Dabangg 3 (2019).

He won the Filmfare Award for Best Actor – Kannada for three consecutive years for his films Huchcha, Nandhi and Swathi Muthu. Since 2013, he has been hosting the television reality show Bigg Boss Kannada. His performance in the 2001 film, Huchcha, earned himh the nickname Kichcha Sudeepa by his fans.

Early life
Sudeepa was born on 2 September 1973 to Sanjeev Manjappa and Saroja in Shimoga in Shimoga district of present-day Karnataka as Sudeep. The family had migrated to Shimoga from Narasimharajapura, Chikmagalur district. He obtained a bachelor's degree in Industrial and production engineering from Dayananda Sagar College of Engineering, Bangalore. He represented the college in under-17 cricket. He attended the Roshan Taneja School of Acting in Mumbai, where he overcame his 'shyness'.

Career

Actor
Sudeep began his film career in  Thayavva (1997). He then played a supporting role in Prathyartha, directed by Sunil Kumar Desai, and a lead role in the same director's Sparsha. In 2001, a role in Huchcha gave him his first big following. In 2008 he made his Bollywood debut in Phoonk. He has also starred in Ram Gopal Varma's movies Rann, Phoonk 2 and Rakta Charitra.

Starting from Veera Parampare (2010), he changed his stage name from Sudeep to Sudeepa per S. Narayan's advice and after the film's success he decided to keep the name. His subsequent films, Kempe Gowda and Vishnuvardhana (2011), also were successes.

Sudeepa made his debut in Telugu cinema in 2012, with S. S. Rajamouli's  Eega, a fantasy film in which he portrayed an industrialist who, on falling for an NGO worker (played by Samantha Ruth Prabhu), kills her alleged lover, who begins to haunt him in the form of a housefly. The film and Sudeepa's performance were highly acclaimed.
 
In 2013, Bachchan and Varadanayaka were released. His next film was a drama titled Maanikya that he also directed, a remake of the Telugu film, Mirchi (2013) which was a huge hit. In 2015 he starred in Ranna, a remake of the Telugu film, Attarintiki Daredi, which again was a blockbuster and played a cameo role as a Persian arms trader in Baahubali: The Beginning, directed by S. S. Rajamouli—the year's highest-grossing film.

He frequently sings in his screen roles, including Vaalee (2001), Chandu (2002), Ranga SSLC (2004), Nalla (2004), #73, Shaanthi Nivaasa (2007), Veera Madakari (2009), Kempe Gowda (2011), Bachchan (2013) and also for others movies such as Mandya to Mumbai (2014), Ring Road Shubha (2014) and Raate (2015).

In 2019, Sudeepa was seen in the Hindi film Dabangg 3 where he played the archenemy of Salman Khan's Chulbul Pandey.

Sudeepa completed his 26 years in film industry.

Sudeepa's next Vikrant Rona, directed by Anup Bhandari, featured Nirup Bhandari and Neetha Ashok. He is also set to play an extended cameo as Bhargav Bakshi in the upcoming Pan India movie Kabzaa starring Upendra.

Director and producer
Sudeepa's directorial debut was My autograph in 2006 which went on to complete 175 days and was a commercial success. From then he has directed many Kannada films like No 73, Shanthi Nivasa, Veera Madakari, Just Maath Mathalli, Kempe Gowda and Maanikya. He also wrote the script for Just Maath Mathalli.

He owns a film production company named Kiccha Creations, which is credited with My Autograph (2006), No 73, Shantinivasa (2007), Jigarthanda (2016), Maanikya (2013), Ambi Ning Vayassayto (2019).

Television
Sudeepa made his TV debut in the serial Premada Kadambari, named after a line in the song Bandhana on Udaya TV. He was roped in to play the main host of the reality show Pyate Hudgeer-Halli Lifu, aired on Suvarna, which was an immediate success. Endemol Shine Group's flagship show Big Brother was adapted to Kannada as Bigg Boss Kannada and Sudeepa was the chosen to play the host for the first season which was aired on ETV Kannada. He continued to host the second season on Asianet Suvarna.

Personal life
Sudeepa is the captain of Karnataka Bulldozers cricket team that competes in the Celebrity Cricket League.

Sudeepa met Priya Radhakrishna in Bengaluru, in 2000 and they married in 2001. Priya worked in an airline company and then in a bank, prior to their marriage. Their only child, Saanvi, was born in 2004. In 2013, Sudeepa launched Stage 360°, an events management company, that his wife took an active part in. The couple split in September 2015, and reconciled

In the media

Sudeepa has been described by the critics as one of the most talented actors in Kannada cinema. He was listed first in the Times 25 Most Desirable Men in Bangalore in 2012. In 2012, he was given a title, "Abhinaya Chakravarthy", by a Kannada organisation, Karnataka Rakshana Vedike.

In 2012, Sudeepa was signed as the Brand Ambassador of Joyalukkas, a Jewellery Retail Chain. In 2013, he was appointed as the Brand Ambassador for Bangalore Traffic Police Department and Income Tax Department. In 2014, he was appointed as the Brand Ambassador for Intex Technologies (India) Mobiles & Paragon Footwear.

In 2013, on World AIDS Day, Sudeepa teamed up with Vijay Raghavendra and other actors to record voiceovers for the TeachAids interactive software, developed at Stanford University.

In 2015, Sudeepa appeared in advertisements in the Kannada language for OLX.in, along with the veteran Kannada actor, Anant Nag. He had previously appeared in ads with Sadhu Kokila for the same company.

In 2021, Sudeepa along with other celebrities and billionaires participated in the "Checkmate Covid" charity event for the COVID-19 Pandemic where they played in a chess simultaneous exhibition hosted by former World Chess Champion Viswanathan Anand. In 2022, he was appointed brand ambassador of Karnataka Animal Husbandry Department's cow adoption programme. On 13 June 2021, Sudeep along with Sajid Nadiadwala and Nikhil Kamath, Chief Information Officer and co-founder of Zerodha, cheated during the online charity event against five-time world chess champion Vishwanathan Anand. Chess.com suspended their accounts for violating fair play.

Humanitarian work 
Sudeepa is involved in humanitarian works through his organisation Kiccha Sudeepa Charitable Society. The trust helps underprivileged school children, providing them with uniforms as well as scholarships. The society helped senior Kannada film artists, technicians and others by providing them with necessary help during Covid pandemic who were unable to get work.

Filmography

Awards and nominations

Discography

As playback singer

Notes

References

External links

 
 
 
 

1971 births
Living people
Indian male film actors
Indian male television actors
Male actors in Hindi cinema
Male actors in Kannada cinema
Male actors in Tamil cinema
Male actors in Telugu cinema
Kannada film directors
Film directors from Bangalore
Filmfare Awards South winners
Kannada playback singers
People from Shimoga district
Indian game show hosts
Bigg Boss Kannada
Bigg Boss
Indian male playback singers
Singers from Bangalore
Male actors from Bangalore
Male actors in Kannada television
21st-century Indian male actors